The 2018 Super W season was the inaugural year of the women's Super W rugby union competition. The winners were the New South Wales Waratahs.

Ladder

Results

Week 1

Week 2

Week 3

Week 4

Week 5

Grand Final

References

2018
2018 in Australian rugby union
2018 in women's rugby union
2018 in Australian women's sport